Henry Chukwudum Ndukuba (born 18 July 1961) is the current Primate of the Church of Nigeria. Prior to his appointment, he was Archbishop of Jos and Bishop of Gombe.

Biography
Henry Ndukuba was born in a Christian home in Anambra State. His parents, Silas and Selina Ndukuba, were Christian Missionary Society (now known as Anglican) school and church teachers from Ogberuru in Diocese of Orlu, (which happens to be Henry's home diocese) Orlu, Imo State. Ndukuba is married to Angela E. Ndukuba (née Okoro), an educationist. They have six children, a grandson and two granddaughters.

Education
He attended Bishop Shanahan College, Orlu and had his WASC in 1978. He worked in Kano State Library, ministry of education 1979–1980. He attended the Theological College of Northern Nigeria from 1980 and obtained a B.D. in 1984. He did his NYSC in Kano State 1984–1985. He obtained a MA in systematic Theology, from Durham University, England, in 1990 and another in Christian Education at Princeton Theological Seminary in 1996. In 1996, he won the John Havran's Princeton Prize for Christian Education.

Priesthood
He was ordained into the deaconate in 1984 by Bishop B.B. Ayam at the age 23 and to the priesthood in 1985. He became canon in 1989 at the age of 28 and an archdeacon in 1992 at the age 31. He served in St George's Anglican Church Borupai Kano until he was sent to teach in St. Francis of Assisi Theological College, Wusasa Zaria in 1985, where become the acting dean. In July 1996 he was moved back to be the Archdeacon of Kano and help stabilize the Anglican Diocese of Kano after some turbulent period. In July 1999 he was requested to return as Dean of St. Francis College, Wusasa. On 21 September 1999, he was consecrated as the first Bishop of the Diocese of Gombe, at the aged of 38 years old. On 25 November 1999 the new diocese was inaugurated as the 71st diocese of the Church of Nigeria. As the Bishop of Gombe, the Anglican diocese has grown from 18 congregation to over 150 churches. Church planting and evangelism, raising of lay and pastoral leadership and discipleship remain the core of his ministry.
He worked with communities and leaders of Gombe state to establish peaceful coexistence and community development. In order to sustain the ministry of the gospel in Gombe state, Bishop Henry worked with Luke partnership, Nigeria Bible Translation Trust and Seed company to produce literary materials and translate the Bible and Jesus film into 10 of the 17 tribal languages of the state. He was succeeded by Cletus Tambari as the Bishop of Gombe. Bishop Tambari was consecrated by the outgoing Primate Nicholas Okoh on 20 March 2020 at Cathedral Church of Holy Trinity, Lokoja, Kogi State.

He is the chairman of the liturgy and spirituality committee of the Church of Nigeria whose responsibility is to produce the Annual Bible study manual and Daily fountain devotional, Sunday school manual and youth devotional.

His committee has produced the new Book of Common Prayer and Hymnal for the Church of Nigeria. He also serves as the chairman of the Church of Nigeria Historical records and Artifacts committee, charged with the responsibility of recording and preserving the historical records and artifacts of the Church and set up an Archives.

He is the BOT Chairman of LIST the registered body working on translation of Bible, Jesus Film and literary materials in Nigeria languages especially minority languages in Nigeria.

He is a biblical scholar, teacher, master liturgist, pastor and an accomplished evangelist. He is also a prolific writer.

On 22 September 2017, the House of Bishops elected Ndukuba as the new Archbishop of Jos. He succeeded Benjamin Kwashi, the Bishop of Jos. The province of Jos comprises ten dioceses in North-Central of Nigeria. In January, 2020, Markus Ibrahim was elected as the new Archbishop of the Anglican Province of Jos to replace Archbishop Ndukuba, who was soon to be enthroned as the Primate of all Nigeria. Archbishop Ibrahim was also the Bishop of the Anglican Diocese of Yola at the time.

Controversy
In March 2021, the Archbishop of Canterbury, Justin Welby, said that Ndukuba's call for "the virus" of homosexuality to be "expunged" was "...unacceptable. It dehumanises those human beings of whom the statement speak".

5th Primate of the Church of Nigeria
On 24 September 2019, he was elected Archbishop, Metropolitan and Primate of All Nigeria at the Episcopal Synod of the Church of Nigeria in Asaba, Delta State. On 25 March 2020, he assumed office as the Primate of Nigeria, and the Bishop of Abuja, taking over from Nicholas Okoh.

References

1961 births
Living people
Anglican archbishops of Jos
Primates of the Church of Nigeria
21st-century Anglican bishops in Nigeria
21st-century Anglican archbishops
Anglican bishops of Abuja
Anglican bishops of Gombe
People from Anambra State
Church of Nigeria archdeacons
Alumni of Durham University
Anglican realignment people